Eddie Van Hoof (born 22 August 1956) is a British gymnast. He competed in eight events at the 1984 Summer Olympics.

References

External links
 

1956 births
Living people
British male artistic gymnasts
Olympic gymnasts of Great Britain
Gymnasts at the 1984 Summer Olympics
People from Stainforth, South Yorkshire